The 1964 Copa Libertadores Finals was a football series between Argentine team Independiente and Uruguayan team Nacional on August 6 and 12 of this same year. It was the fifth final of South America's most prestigious football competition, the Copa de Campeones (known in the modern era as "Copa Libertadores").

Both teams played the Copa Libertadores finals for the first time in their history.

Qualified teams

Venues

Match details

First leg

Second leg

References

1964
1
Club Nacional de Football matches
Club Atlético Independiente matches
1964 in Uruguayan football
1964 in Argentine football
Football in Avellaneda